The Office of Population Censuses and Surveys (OPCS), was created in May 1970 through the merger of the General Register Office and the Government Social Survey Department.

It was a forerunner and constituent, with the UK Central Statistical Office, of the Office for National Statistics, in which they combined in 1996 under a single director who, from 2000 was also known as the National Statistician. The director of OPCS was also Registrar-General for England and Wales.

See also
 OPCS-4

References

Office for National Statistics
Demographics of the United Kingdom
Population Censuses and Surveys
1970 establishments in the United Kingdom